Dr. B.R. Ambedkar Open University, also known as Telangana Open University, formerly Andhra Pradesh Open University, is a public university in the city of Hyderabad, Telangana, India.

History
The university was established in 1982 as Andhra Pradesh Open University through the Andhra Pradesh Open University Act, 1982. It was inaugurated by the President of India. The founder and first vice chancellor (VC) was G. Ram Reddy. The university was renamed Dr. B.R. Ambedkar Open University in 1991 through the Andhra Pradesh Open University (Amendment) Act, 1991, named after the architect of the Indian Constitution Dr. Bhimrao Ramji Ambedkar on the occasion of the centenary of his birth.

Vice chancellors 
V. S. Prasad was appointed VC in 2001. P. Prakash was appointed in 2011. C. Parthasarathi was appointed VC in-charge in July 2019. Sita Rama Rao was appointed VC in 2021.

Campus
There are laboratories in the Science Faculty for providing hands on training to Science Students of Physics, Chemistry, Geology, Botany, and Zoology. The Science Practicals hereafter will be conducted at the Newly constructed Science and Technology Multi Functional Lab (STML) building at the Campus all under one roof. The Narla Memorial Library is also housed in the Academic Building. A Multimedia Lab, Two Synergy Halls, a well-furnished Faculty Room and a Language Lab have also been set up in the Academic Building. All the buildings on the campus are linked by the LAN facility.

See also
 List of universities in India
 Universities and colleges in India
 Education in India
 List of institutions of higher education in Telangana

References

External links

Dr. B.R. Ambedkar Open University
Educational institutions established in 1982
1982 establishments in Andhra Pradesh
Open universities in India
State universities in Telangana